is a 2016 Japanese jidaigeki comedy film directed by Katsuhide Motoki. It follows 2014's Samurai Hustle. It was released in Japan by Shochiku on September 10, 2016. Kazuyoshi Saito wrote  to be its theme song.

Plot

Cast
 Kuranosuke Sasaki
 Kyoko Fukada
 Tsuyoshi Ihara
 Yasufumi Terawaki
 Yusuke Kamiji
 Yuri Chinen
 Tokio Emoto
 Seiji Rokkaku
 Arata Furuta
 Koen Kondo
 Hiroyuki Watanabe
 Akiyoshi Nakao
 
 
 Yasuko Tomita
 Ichikawa Ennosuke III
 Renji Ishibashi
 Takanori Jinnai
 Kazuhiko Nishimura

Reception

References

External links
  

Jidaigeki films
Japanese comedy films
2016 comedy films
Shochiku films
Films directed by Katsuhide Motoki
2010s Japanese films
2010s Japanese-language films